A Short, Sharp Shock (sometimes titled Short, Sharp Shock) is a 1990 fantasy novel by Kim Stanley Robinson. The story deals with a man who awakens without memory in a strange land and journeys through it to find the woman he woke alongside.

His journey takes him along the narrow strip of land, surrounded by ocean, which makes up the whole world.  

The phrase "short, sharp shock" is taken from Gilbert and Sullivan's operetta The Mikado.

References

External links
 Google Books

1990 American novels
Novels by Kim Stanley Robinson
American fantasy novels